The 2011 World Financial Group Classic was held from November 11 to 13 at the Calgary Curling Club in Calgary, Alberta as part of the 2011–12 World Curling Tour. The purse for the event was CAD$24,000, and the event was held in a round robin format.

Teams
The teams are listed as follows:

Round robin standings

Playoffs

References

External links

World Financial Group Classic
Sport in Calgary
Curling in Alberta